Mountain Valley High School (Mountain Valley or MVHS) is a public high school in Rumford, Maine, United States, serving the towns of Rumford and nearby Mexico. It was formed in 1989 as a result of the merger of the towns' high schools. During the 2007–08 school year, MVHS had 589 enrolled students, 64 faculty and 147 students in the graduating class.   The school is accredited through the New England Association of Schools and Colleges.

Athletics
Football: On November 14, 2010, Mountain Valley won the Western Maine Class B championship with an 18–0 win over Wells High School and later won the state championship against Leavitt. It was the 5th Western Maine Class B championship in the last 7 seasons. The team won the Class B championships in 2004, 2006, 2008, and 2010.
The seniors, led by captains Taylor Bradley, Cam Kaubris, and Christian Durland, dedicated their state championship in 2010 to former teammate, Danny Garneau, who died of cancer the year before.

References

Public high schools in Maine
Schools in Oxford County, Maine
Rumford, Maine